Bridgeton Public Schools is a comprehensive community public school district that serves students in pre-kindergarten through twelfth grade from the city of Bridgeton, in Cumberland County, New Jersey, United States. The district is one of 31 former Abbott districts statewide that were established pursuant to the decision by the New Jersey Supreme Court in Abbott v. Burke which are now referred to as "SDA Districts" based on the requirement for the state to cover all costs for school building and renovation projects in these districts under the supervision of the New Jersey Schools Development Authority.

As of the 2020–21 school year, the district, comprised of eight schools, had an enrollment of 6,313 students and 511.0 classroom teachers (on an FTE basis), for a student–teacher ratio of 12.4:1.

The district is classified by the New Jersey Department of Education as being in District Factor Group "A", the lowest of eight groupings. District Factor Groups organize districts statewide to allow comparison by common socioeconomic characteristics of the local districts. From lowest socioeconomic status to highest, the categories are A, B, CD, DE, FG, GH, I and J.

Students from Downe Township and some students from Lawrence Township (other students are sent to Millville Senior High School) attend the district's high school for ninth through twelfth grades as part of sending/receiving relationships.

History
In 1948 schools were racially integrated, and all of the teachers were white.

Schools
Schools in the district (with 2020–21 enrollment data from the National Center for Education Statistics) are:
Pre-Schools
Geraldine O. Foster Early Childhood Center (308 students in PreK)
Elementary schools
Broad Street School (936; K-8)
Buckshutem Road School (686; K-8)
Cherry Street School (558; K-8)
ExCEL School (enrollment not listed; K-8)
Indian Avenue School (668; K-8)
Quarter Mile Lane School (744; PreK-8)
West Avenue School (552; K-8)
High school
Bridgeton High School (1,560; 9-12)

Administration
Core members of the district's administration are:
Keith Miles, Superintendent
Nicole Albanese, Business Administrator / Board Secretary

Board of education
The district's board of education, comprised of nine members, sets policy and oversees the fiscal and educational operation of the district through its administration. As a Type II school district, the board's trustees are elected directly by voters to serve three-year terms of office on a staggered basis, with three seats up for election each year held (since 2016) as part of the November general election. The board appoints a superintendent to oversee the district's day-to-day operations and a business administrator to supervise the business functions of the district.

References

External links
Bridgeton Public Schools

School Data for the Bridgeton Public Schools, National Center for Education Statistics

Bridgeton, New Jersey
New Jersey Abbott Districts
New Jersey District Factor Group A
School districts in Cumberland County, New Jersey